Donald MacRae may refer to:

Donald MacRae (astronomer) (1916–2006), Canadian astronomer
Donald MacRae (Gaelic singer) (born 1941), Scottish folk singer
Donald Gunn MacRae (1921–1997), British sociologist

See also
Donald McRae (disambiguation)